Michael Alford (born 1969) is the current athletic director for Florida State. Alford was previously the athletic director for Central Michigan.

Education
Alford first attended Mississippi State University but then transferred to the University of Alabama at Birmingham. While at UAB, Alford received his bachelor's degree in communication. Later, Alford received his master's degree in athletic administration from the University of Arkansas.

Athletic director

Central Michigan
Alford became the athletic director for Central Michigan University following marketing positions for Alabama, the Dallas Cowboys, and Oklahoma. While at Central Michigan, Alford hired eight head coaches for various departments and guided Central Michigan to a 600% revenue increase.

Florida State
After briefly being the CEO for Seminoles Boosters, Alford became the athletic director for Florida State University. Alford replaced David Coburn who retired days earlier.

References

1969 births
Living people
Mississippi State University alumni
University of Alabama at Birmingham alumni
University of Arkansas alumni
Central Michigan Chippewas athletic directors
Florida State Seminoles athletic directors